

Belgium
 Congo Free State 
 Camille Janssen, Governor-General of the Congo Free State (1886–1891)
 Henri-Ernest Gondry, Governor of the Congo Free State (1891)
 Camille-Aimé Coquilhat, Governor of the Congo Free State (1891–1892)

France
 French Somaliland – Léonce Lagarde, Governor of French Somaliland (1888–1899)
 Riviéres du Sud –
 Jean-Marie Bayol, Lieutenant-Governor of Riviéres du Sud (1882–1891)
 Noël-Eugène Ballay, Lieutenant-Governor of Riviéres du Sud (1891–1892)

Netherlands
 Dutch East Indies -

Portugal
 Angola – Gilherme Auguste de Brito Capelo, Governor-General of Angola (1886–1892)

United Kingdom
 British Virgin Islands – Edward John Cameron, Administrator of the British Virgin Islands (1887–1894)
 India -
 Malta Colony – Henry Augustus Smyth, Governor of Malta (1890–1893)
 New South Wales – Victor Villiers, Lord Jersey, Governor of New South Wales (1891–1893)
 Queensland – Field Marshal Sir Henry Norman, Governor of Queensland (1889–1895)
 Tasmania – Robert Hamilton, Governor of Tasmania (1887–1892)
 South Australia – Algernon Keith-Falconer, Lord Kintore, Governor of South Australia (1889–1895)
 Victoria – John Hope, Earl of Hopetoun, Governor of Victoria (1889–1895)
 Western Australia – Sir William Robinson, Governor of Western Australia (1890–1895)

Colonial governors
Colonial governors
1891